Events in the year 2023 in Brazil.

Incumbents

Federal government 
 President
 Luiz Inácio Lula da Silva (2023 – present)
 Vice President
 Geraldo Alckmin (2023 – present)
 President of the Chamber of Deputies
 Arthur Lira (2021 – present)
 President of the Federal Senate
 Rodrigo Pacheco (2021 – present)
 President of the Federal Supreme Court
 Rosa Weber (2022 – present)

Events

January 
 1 January:
 Luiz Inácio Lula da Silva is sworn in as the next president after defeating incumbent president Jair Bolsonaro in a runoff election held on 30 October 2022, receiving 50.90% of the total votes to Bolsonaro's 49.10% 
 Lula declares three days of national mourning for footballer Pelé, who died on 29 December 2022.
 8 January:
 Supporters of the previous president, Jair Bolsonaro, attacked the Supreme Court of Brazil, National Congress of Brazil, and the Planalto Presidential Palace in the Praça dos Três Poderes in the federal capital Brasília.
18 January: Lula dismisses 13 more military personnel from the presidential cabinet, whom he blames for the attack in Brasília.
21 January: Commander of the Brazilian Army Júlio César de Arruda is fired by Lula in the aftermath of the Brasília attack and is replaced by Tomás Miguel Ribeiro Paiva.

February 
 3 February: The navy scuttles the decommissioned aircraft carrier São Paulo into the Atlantic Ocean, following the rejections of injunctions from the Ministry of the Environment and the Federal Public Ministry.
 18–21 February: floods and landslides kill at least 44 people in São Sebastião.

Predicted and scheduled 
 25 March: São Paulo ePrix
 14 October: An annular solar eclipse will be visible in the Western U.S., Mexico, Central America, Colombia, and Brazil and will be the 44th solar eclipse of Solar Saros 134.

Deaths

January 
8 January
Walter Tosta, 66, politician, deputy (2011–2015).
Roberto Dinamite, 68, footballer (Vasco da Gama, national team) and politician, deputy (1995–2015).
12 January – Claudio Willer, 82, poet and translator.

See also 

COVID-19 pandemic in South America
Mercosur
Organization of American States
Organization of Ibero-American States
Community of Portuguese Language Countries

References 

 	

 
Brazil
Brazil
2020s in Brazil
Years of the 21st century in Brazil